Tarasevich (Cyrillic: Тарасевич) is a gender-neutral Slavic surname. Notable people with the surname include:
Arseny Tarasevich-Nikolaev (born 1993), Russian concert pianist
Grigoriy Tarasevich (born 1995), Russian swimmer
Sergey Tarasevich (born 1973), Belarusian rower
Svetlana Tarasevich (born 1979), Belarusian gymnast
Vsevolod Tarasevich (1919–1998), Soviet photographer

Belarusian-language surnames